Conjurers Lodge is a former Methodist chapel and workshop on the Isle of Portland, Dorset, England. It is located on the corner of Clements Lane within the village of Chiswell. Established in 1816, the chapel was in use for a decade. The lodge has been Grade II Listed since 1993 and is described as a "rare surviving example of its kind" on the island.

Following rumours of local Methodists believing in witchcraft, investigations by Rev. Francis Derry led to 50 members of Portland's society being expelled in 1816. This group then established a chapel on the upper floor of a workshop in Chiswell, which gained the name Conjurers Lodge. It remained in use for ten years until 1826, when the Methodist society was united once again. Portland Joinery later used the building as a workshop from 1973 to 2003.

References

Isle of Portland
Chapels in England
Former churches in Dorset
Former Methodist churches in the United Kingdom
Methodist churches in Dorset
Grade II listed churches in Dorset
1816 establishments in England
Religious organizations established in 1816